The Never Say Die! Tour was a concert tour by the English heavy metal band Black Sabbath. The tour began on 16 May 1978 in Sheffield and ended on 11 December 1978 in Albuquerque, New Mexico. It was the last full tour with Ozzy Osbourne until the band reunited for Ozzfest 1997.

Background

Europe (1st leg)
Van Halen opened. "We did 23 shows in 25 days," recalled Eddie Van Halen. "I didn't know they had that many places! But to meet Tony Iommi when I was so into him was really incredible." David Lee Roth summed up the experience as "a real shot in the ass". The Liverpool Empire Theatre date was attended by future members of Apollo 440 – who, in 1997, issued an adaptation of Van Halen's 'Ain't Talkin' 'bout Love' as 'Ain't Talkin' 'bout Dub'.

"We had a great time with the Sabbath guys…" recalled Alex Van Halen. "It was really special because Ed and I were big fans of the band. Every time they came to LA, I was out there in the audience, fighting tooth and nail to get to the front so I could get my eardrums destroyed. But I learnt a lot from them about audience participation… One time, we were up near Leicester, about half an hour before showtime, and Ozzy and Bill Ward were out there on the front lawn with the punters, having a beer. I thought, 'Fuck me, none of this star-type shit.' I was really impressed."

"Ozzy used to tell a funny story…" recalled onetime Osbourne sidekick Don Airey. "Sabbath had done a tour for a year [sic] with Kiss… and it nearly killed him because Kiss had been so good. And he said, 'We're never doing that again. Next tour, we just want a bar band from LA. That's all we want.' And then he got to the first gig. Ozzy said they walked in as 'Eruption' was going on. Ozzy said, 'We just went into the dressing room. We sat there going, That was incredible… and then it finished, and we were just too stunned to speak. Then there was a knock on the door and the best-looking man in the world walked in and said, Hello' – you know, David Lee Roth. I think they only lasted about two months on that tour. Then the record broke… I went to see them at the Rainbow when they supported Sabbath. By the time they played the Rainbow again a month later, they were headlining. Incredible!"

Support for the end of the UK leg of the tour was from psychedelic punk group Tanz Der Youth who received a hostile response from the audience.

North America (1st leg)
"At all our shows on this tour," Ozzy told Circus, "there's one guy that gives me the evil eye. It's not the same guy at each show – at least I don't think it's the same guy. But it's kind of frightening to feel those vibes." Of the tour, he said: "The crowds are going fucking wild. In Cape Cod the other night [4 September], they were going fucking insane. Man, it was scary up there. We didn't expect this response." Van Halen, he said, "are so good they ought to be headlining the tour."

Setlist

Typical setlist
Supertzar [Audio introduction]
"Symptom of the Universe"
"War Pigs"
"Snowblind"
"Never Say Die"
"Black Sabbath"
"Dirty Women"
"Rock 'N' Roll Doctor"
Drum Solo
Guitar Solo
"Electric Funeral"
"Fairies Wear Boots"
"Iron Man"
"Children of the Grave"
"Paranoid"
She's Gone [Audio outro]

Songs played overall
"Symptom of the Universe"
"War Pigs"
"Snowblind"
"Never Say Die"
"Black Sabbath"
"Shock Wave"
"Sweet Leaf"
"Dirty Women"
"Rock 'N' Roll Doctor"
Bill Ward drum solo
Instrumental band jam
"Tony Iommi Guitar Solo"
"Orchid"
"Electric Funeral"
"Sabbath Bloody Sabbath"
"Fairies Wear Boots"
"Iron Man"
"Hand of Doom"
"Behind the Wall of Sleep"
"Bassically" Geezer Butler [bass solo]
"N.I.B."
"Gypsy"
"Embryo" and "Children of the Grave"
"Paranoid"
She's Gone [Audio outro]

Tour dates

Box office score data

Personnel
Tony Iommi – guitar
Geezer Butler – bass
Bill Ward – drums
Ozzy Osbourne – lead vocals

References

Black Sabbath concert tours
1978 concert tours